Sheikh Abdullah bin Nasser bin Khalifa Al Thani (born 1960) is a Qatari politician, who served as the Prime Minister of Qatar from 26 June 2013 until his resignation on 28 January 2020. A member of the ruling family, he was Minister of State for Internal Affairs from 2005 to 2013.

Early life and education
He is the son of Sheikh Nasser bin Khalifa Al Thani. His mother is Sheikha Mariam bint Abdullah Al Attiyah who died in December 2019. According to royal ark web site, Sheikh Abdullah is the agnatic great–grandson of Ahmed bin Muhammed Al Thani, who was son of Mohammed bin Thani; Abdullah is agnatic third cousin of the former emir Hamad bin Khalifa.

Sheikh Abdullah graduated from Durham Military College, United Kingdom, in 1984 and received a bachelor's degree in police sciences. In 1995, he graduated from Beirut Arab University, receiving a bachelor's degree in legislation.

Career

Al Thani joined the Qatari military and was appointed as patrol officer at rescue police section in 1985. In 1989, he was appointed as security officer for stadiums at the capital security section. Then he became assistant commander for the support brigade in the emergency police section.  He was appointed as commander for special operations brigade in the special security force department and as commander for the special unit of the special security force department. On 28 December 2001, he was named  assistant director for the special security force department for operations affairs. In September 2004, he was promoted to the rank of brigadier general.

After serving in different posts in the government, on 15 February 2005, he was appointed Minister of State for Interior Affairs. He was named as Prime Minister on 26 June 2013 in a cabinet reshuffle, replacing Hamad bin Jassim Al Thani in the post. He was also named as Minister of the Interior in the same cabinet reshuffle, succeeding Abdullah bin Khalid Al Thani as interior minister. His tenure ended on 28 January 2020.

He serves as the chairman of the 2022 FIFA World Cup Supreme Committee for Delivery & Legacy. A number of media outlets criticized his meeting with Fathi Hamad, a Hamas political leader, in April 2013, and speculated the risks of terrorist acts occurring at the 2022 World Cup. However, before the event took off, The ICSS (International Centre for Sport Security) assisted the State of Qatar for the safety and security concerns regarding the big sporting event, making sure the event is hosted with no obstacles in terms of safety of fans attending the event. The nation has been able to capitalize on unique relevant expertise in the security field as one of the countries with the lowest crime rates in the world (reported by the US Department of state that there have been no terrorism related activity in the country since 2020). “We have developed the safety and security handbook and guidelines for global and continental sports federation, conducted country threat and risk assessments for international tournaments and together with the United Nations Office of Counter Terrorism (UNOCT), in partnership with the United Nations Interregional Crime and Justice Research Institute (UNICRI), the United Nations Alliance of Civilizations (UNAOC)” said Mr. Steven Fleming, Head of Sport Event Security of the ICSS. The ICSS has also been co-leading the UN Global Programme on the Security of Major Sporting Events and the Use of Sport to Prevent Violent Extremism.

Personal life
Al Thani is married and has six children.

Honours
Al Thani was awarded Legion of Honor Award on 19 November 2009.

Ancestry

References

1960 births
Living people
Beirut Arab University alumni
Abdullah bin Nasser bin Khalifa Al
Prime Ministers of Qatar
Government ministers of Qatar
Recipients of the Legion of Honour